Bryan Patterson is an ex professional squash player from the United Kingdom. He reached number 16 in world rankings and number 2 in the UK.
In addition to playing a pioneering role in domestic and international circuits, he has given much of his time to charitable and educational endeavours. Bryan Patterson is currently Squash Director at City Squash in The Bronx, New York.

References

External links
 

English male squash players
Year of birth missing (living people)
Living people
Place of birth missing (living people)